Give It Away is the debut album by American soul group The Chi-Lites, produced by Carl Davis and lead singer Eugene Record.  The album was released in 1969 on the Brunswick label.

History
Give It Away consists of seven original tracks and four cover versions (three Motown songs and "The Twelfth of Never").  The album was well received by critics and sold respectably, with four singles reaching the R&B top 50 and two the Billboard Hot 100.  The album sold mainly to the R&B market, where it peaked at #16.  Five singles were released from the album with the title track charting the highest, #88 on the Billboard Hot 100 and #10 on R&B chart, their first top ten hit.

In 2004, the track "What Do I Wish For" became familiar to television viewers in the United Kingdom when it was used in a commercial for fast food chain KFC.

Track listing

Personnel
Eugene Record, Marshall Thompson, Robert "Squirrel" Lester, Creadel "Red" Jones – vocals

Production
Carl Davis, Eugene Record, Gerald Sims – producers
Willie Henderson – director
Sonny Sanders – arranger

Charts

Singles

References

External links
Give It Away at Discogs

1969 debut albums
The Chi-Lites albums
Brunswick Records albums
Albums produced by Eugene Record